Leonard E. Barrett Senior (1920 in Saint Elizabeth, Jamaica – June 3, 2007 in Cheltenham, Pennsylvania) was a Jamaican-American professor of religion and anthropology known for his foundational work on Rastafarianism.

Biography 
He was born in Jamaica in 1920. He was ordained as a Methodist minister, then migrated to the United States during the 1940s. He received a bachelor's degree from Albright College, then was the pastor of an evangelical church in Pennsylvania. He received a master's of divinity from United Theological Seminary in 1961, then a master's degree in history in 1962 and a doctorate in comparative religion and anthropology in 1967 from Temple University.

His dissertation, completed at Temple University, was published as The Rastafarians: a study of Messianic cultism in Jamaica in 1969. His book Soul-Force: African Heritage in Afro-American Religion was a finalist for the National Book Award for Philosophy And Religion in 1975. His book The Rastafarians: the Dreadlocks of Jamaica was reviewed favorably in the 1970s by academics and has become one of the standard anthropological examinations of the religious movement. It was republished on its twentieth anniversary in 1997. He published widely on various aspects of religious or spiritual life in Jamaica. Barrett also contributed to reference texts in the field of religion.

He was a professor at Temple University. He also taught at colleges in Jamaica, Connecticut, and Puerto Rico.

Awards and honors 
In 1983, he was awarded the Alumni Citation Award from Albright College.

His life inspired one of his sons, Terry Lee Barrett, to write a semi-autobiographical novel based on the stories his father told him about Jamaican religion and spirituality.

Works 

 The Rastafarians: a study of Messianic cultism in Jamaica, Caribbean monograph series, no. 6. (Puerto Rico: University of Puerto Rico, Institute of Caribbean Studies, 1969).
 Soul-Force: African Heritage in Afro-American Religion, C. Eric Lincoln Series on Black Religion (New York: Anchor Press, 1974).
 The Rastafarians: the Dreadlocks of Jamaica (Kingston, Jamaica: Sangster's Book Stores, 1977). 
 Reprinted in 1978, 1979, 1981, 1982. 
 A revised and updated edition titled The Rastafarians: the Sounds of Cultural Difference was published in 1988 that included new research and a new afterword.
 It was also republished in a 20th anniversary edition in 1997, titled The Rastafarians; this was republished in 2014.
 It was also translated into Japanese in 1996. 
 The Sun and the Drum: African roots in Jamaican folk tradition Kingston, (Jamaica: Sangster's Book Stores, in association with Heinemann, 1979).

References 

1920 births
2007 deaths
Temple University alumni
Temple University faculty
Albright College alumni
Jamaican academics
Anthropologists of religion